Nonesuch River Golf Course is an 18-hole golf course located near the Nonesuch River in Scarborough, Maine, United States. Designed primarily by Tom Walker of the United States Golf Association, Nonesuch was opened to the public in 1997.

External links 
 

Golf clubs and courses in Maine
Buildings and structures in Scarborough, Maine
Tourist attractions in Cumberland County, Maine